The 1930 United States Senate election in Wyoming was held on November 4, 1930. Following the death of Republican Senator Francis E. Warren, former Casper Mayor Patrick J. Sullivan was appointed to replace him. Sullivan did not seek re-election, however. Following a contested Republican primary, former Governor Robert D. Carey emerged as the nominee, and faced Democrat Harry Schwartz, an attorney from Casper and a local school board member, in the general election. Despite the strong performance by Democrats nationwide in 1930, Carey defeated Schwartz by a wide margin.

Democratic primary

Candidates
 Harry Schwartz, Casper attorney, local school board member

Results

Republican Primary

Candidates
 Robert D. Carey, former Governor of Wyoming
 Charles E. Winter, former U.S. Congressman from Wyoming's at-large congressional district
 William C. Deming, former Chairman of the United States Civil Service Commission 
 William L. Walls, former Attorney General of Wyoming

Results

General election

Results

References

Wyoming
1930
1930 Wyoming elections